The Tonosí Formation is a geologic formation in Panama. It preserves fossils dating back to the Paleogene period (Priabonian).

Fossil content 
Among others, the formation has provided fossils of:
 Harrisianella sp.

See also 
 List of fossiliferous stratigraphic units in Panama

References

Bibliography

Further reading 
 A. K. Miller and W. M. Furnish. 1939. Aturias from the Eocene of Panama. Journal of Paleontology 13(1):77-79

Geologic formations of Panama
Paleogene Panama
Chadronian
Priabonian Stage
Sandstone formations
Formations